Kirstie Thomson (born 21 October 1988) is a South African cricketer who plays as a right-handed batter and right-arm medium bowler. She made 9 One Day International and 6 Twenty20 International appearances for South Africa between 2009 and 2011. She plays domestic cricket for Central Gauteng.

In April 2021, she was part of the South African Emerging Women's squad that toured Bangladesh.

References

External links
 
 

1988 births
Living people
Cricketers from Johannesburg
South African women cricketers
South Africa women One Day International cricketers
South Africa women Twenty20 International cricketers
Central Gauteng women cricketers